The Kushmore house gecko (Hemidactylus kushmorensis) is a species of gecko. It is endemic to eastern Pakistan.

References

Kushmore house gecko
Reptiles of Pakistan
Endemic fauna of Pakistan
Kushmore house gecko
Taxa named by James A. Murray (zoologist)